Peroxisomal membrane protein 11A is a protein that in humans is encoded by the PEX11A gene.

References

Further reading